Kahitna (pronounced ), a music group from Bandung, Indonesia was formed in 1986 and founded by Yovie Widianto.  Although most of the songs contains love themes in the lyrics, the group is also well known to be able to combine elements of other music genres such as jazz, pop, fusion, Latin and even traditional music.

Members
Current members
 Yovie Widianto – piano, keyboard (1986–present)
 Bambang Purwono – keyboard, backing vocal (1986–present)
 Hedi Yunus – vocal (1986–present)
 Carlo Saba – vocal (1986–present)
 Mario Ginanjar – vocal (2003–present)
 Dody Isniani – bass, acoustic guitar (1986–present)
 Andrie Bayuadjie – lead guitar, acoustic guitar (1986–present)
 Budiana Nugraha – drummer (1986–present)
 Harry Sudirman – percussion (1986–present)

Past members
 Ronni Waluya – vocal (1986–1995)

Timeline

Discography
 Studio Album
 "Cerita Cinta" (1994)
 "Cantik" (1996)
 "Sampai Nanti" (1998)
 "Permaisuriku" (2000)
 "Cinta Sudah Lewat" (2003)
 "Soulmate" (2006)
 "Lebih Dari Sekedar Cantik" (2010)
 "Rahasia Cinta" (2016)

 Compilation
 "The Best of Kahitna" (2002)
 "Cerita Cinta: 25 Tahun Kahitna" (2011)

See also 
 Yovie & Nuno
 Pradikta Wicaksono

References

External links
Official Website
 Band web site
Carlo Saba Official Website

Indonesian pop music groups